The Kicker is an album by the American jazz vibraphonist Bobby Hutcherson, recorded in December 1963 for Blue Note but not released on the label until 1999 as a limited edition. A month earlier, the same musicians recorded guitarist Grant Green's album Idle Moments released in 1965.

Reception

The AllMusic review by Ken Dryden stated: "The first half features the vibraphonist in a cooking hard bop session with Joe Henderson and Duke Pearson, starting with an energetic take on the normally slow ballad 'If Ever I Would Leave You' and a sizzling Hutcherson original, 'For Duke P.' Guitarist Grant Green is added for the second half, beginning with the first recording of Henderson's 'The Kicker', which became well known from its later rendition on Horace Silver's best selling release Song for My Father".

Track listing
 "If Ever I Would Leave You" (Lerner, Loewe) - 10:33
 "Mirrors" (Joe Chambers) - 6:52
 "For Duke P." (Bobby Hutcherson) - 7:54
 "The Kicker" (Joe Henderson) - 6:07
 "Step Lightly" (Henderson) - 14:18
 "Bedouin" (Pearson) - 8:11

Personnel
Bobby Hutcherson - vibes
Joe Henderson - tenor saxophone
Duke Pearson - piano
Grant Green - guitar (#4-6)
Bob Cranshaw - bass
Al Harewood - drums

References 

Blue Note Records albums
Bobby Hutcherson albums
1999 albums
Albums produced by Alfred Lion
Albums recorded at Van Gelder Studio